Bishop Moore Vidyapith, Cherthala is a CBSE school run by the Church of South India (CSI) Diocese of Madhya Kerala, established in 2001. The school has a student strength of over 2000 pupils and about 100 staff (teaching and non-teaching).

The school is one among the many institutions that are set by his name including those in Mavelikara and Kayamkulam.

Overview
Rt. Rev. Edward Alfred Lingingstone Moore was born in England in 1870 took his M.A. from Oxford University and became a missionary of the Church Missionary Society in India. At the age of 33 he was appointed as the principal of the CMS College Kottayam. In 1925, he was ordained as the 4th Bishop of the Diocese of Travancore-Cochin and took charge of the Diocese at Kottayam in the same year. As a Bishop he was determined to put an end to the demon of the caste system.

Management
 The school has been established and is managed by the Diocese of Madhya Kerala of the Church of South India. 
 Rt. Rev. Dr. Malayil Sabu Koshy Cherian, the Bishop of the Diocese is the Chairman of the School Governing Council. 
 Prof. Jose Paikad, the Corporate Manager of the Self Financing Schools of CSI Diocese of Madhya Kerala, is the Manager of the school. 
 Rev. Jiji Joseph, a presbyter of CSI, is the Bursar and Local Manager of the school. 
 The School Governing Council consists of the Diocesan Officials, Corporate Manager, Bursar, and other members of the Diocese. 
 Other than the Cherthala Bishop Moore Vidyapith, the Diocese runs around 400 Aided and Unaided schools.

The Church of South India inherits a tradition from the CMS Missionaries who pioneered English education in the state and opened the portals of its educational centers to the women and other marginalised sections of the society.

Bursars 
 Rev. George Mathew (2004-2008)
 Rev. Mathews P. Oommen (2008-2010)
 Rev. Jacob Johnson (2010-2014)
 Rev. Alex P. Oommen (2014-2018)
 Rev. Jiji Joseph (2018-2022)
 Rev. Thomas K. Prasad (2022- till date)

CSI
The Church of South India is the result of the union of churches of varying traditions Anglican, Methodist, Congregational, Presbyterian, and Reformed—in that area. It was inaugurated in September 1947.

Being the largest Protestant church in India, the CSI celebrates its life with Indian culture and spirituality and raises its voice for the voiceless on matters of justice, peace and integrity of creation. It shares the love of Jesus Christ with the people of India through proclamation of the good news of Jesus; responding to human need through institutional and emergency relief work; through community development projects and skill training programmes for the marginalized and disadvantaged sections of the people and programmes for the integrity of creation.

Diocese
The Anglican Diocese of Travancore & Cochin, which had been in existence since 1879, came to be known as the Diocese of Central Travancore on the formation of the CSI on 27 September 1947. Subsequently, it was renamed the Diocese of Madhya Kerala.

References

External links

Church of South India schools
Christian schools in Kerala
Private schools in Kerala
Schools in Alappuzha district
Educational institutions established in 2001
2001 establishments in Kerala